The Lesser Poland regional leagues, or the Ligi regionalne - Małopolski ZPN are the tier five to tier nine of the football leagues of the  Polish football hierarchy organized in Lesser Poland.

The tournaments are organized by the Lesser Poland Football Association ( MZPN).

History
In connection with the  administrative reform of the country in 1999 and the decisions of the Polish Football Association ( PZPN) congress to establish football associations in all 16 voivodships, the founding assembly of the Krakow Football Association "Lesser Poland" with its seat in Kraków was convened on June 2, 2000, covering clubs from the new Lesser Poland Voivodeship. In accordance with the recommendation of the Polish Football Association, the new association adopted the name of the Lesser Poland Football Association ( MZPN), its statute was registered on September 22, 2000 by the District Court in Kraków, and on November 22 of that year, the MZPN was registered by the National Court Register.

Lesser Poland regional leagues system

 * : III liga is not organized by MZPN as it is a national championship divided into groups of bigger regions then  Lesser Poland, but due to the introduction of Ekstraklasa it has become the fourth level of the  Polish football hierarchy
 The number (#) in Klasa A (#), Klasa B (#) and Klasa C (#), represents the number of groups in these leagues per season.

References

External links
 MZPN official website 

Football leagues in Poland
Lesser Poland Voivodeship